The 1983 James Madison Dukes football team was an American football team that represented James Madison University during the 1983 NCAA Division I-AA football season as an independent. In their twelfth year under head coach Challace McMillin, the team compiled an 3–8 record.

Schedule

References

James Madison
James Madison Dukes football seasons
James Madison Dukes football